The Competition Bureau of Canada alleged, in court documents released 31 January 2018, that seven Canadian bread companies committed indictable offences in what journalist Michael Enright later termed "the great Canadian bread price-fixing scandal" of 2018. Penalties can range from $25 million to a prison term of 14 years.

Synopsis
Canadians had been victimised over a 14-year or a 16-year period, the bureau said, noting that the scheme inflated the price of bread by at least $1.50. It became known to insiders as the "7/10 convention", according to the bureau documents: a usual seven cent price increase at wholesale and ten cent price bump for the consumer in stores. Between 2001 and 2015, the consumer price index for bread, rolls and buns rose by 96 per cent, according to Statistics Canada, while during that same time, the CPI for all food purchased from stores increased about 45 per cent. The bureau was approached by informants from Loblaw Companies in 2015 and filed the affidavit late in 2017 along with evidence in order to convince a judge to grant it search warrants, which it executed on 31 October. No charges had been filed as of January 2018 and none of the allegations had been proven in court to that date. The senior officers of Canada Bread, since 23 May 2014 a Grupo Bimbo subsidiary, and Weston Foods, now a sister company to Loblaws under parent George Weston Limited, colluded to boost bread prices, and later strong-armed retailers to increase their prices in tandem. The two named companies became aware of the investigation on 31 October 2017, and decided to co-operate with investigators in December in exchange for receiving immunity from prosecution.

A statement issued by Canada Bread noted that the George Weston and Loblaw informants admitted to inappropriate conduct and accused "certain former Canada Bread executives" dating back to 2001 "while Canada Bread was under previous ownership."

The retailers who participated in the scheme, including Sobeys and Metro, allegedly "demanded" that the bread suppliers manage actively their retail competition by co-ordinating bread prices between the retailers. The affidavit also refers to a series of alleged incidents and emails that appear to implicate senior officials at bread suppliers and relevant category managers at the retailers:

An academic from Dalhousie University who was a professor of 'food distribution and policy' said that he had previously been unaware of this issue, and "Now, I'm asking myself where else in the grocery store is there collusion other than bread. That's the real question, I think."

In an analysis performed by Grier and published by Markusoff, the cost differential between actual and normative CPI data, of a weekly loaf purchase over the decade-and-a-half interval, was on the order of 400 dollars. Markusoff notes that "According to the Bureau of Labor Statistics, American consumers saw bread prices rise half as fast as happened in Canada during the time of Loblaws' misconduct."

On 8 January 2018 in an attempt to pacify public opinion, Loblaws offered a $25 gift card, which it announced in early December 2017. The retailer expected as many as six million Canadians to receive the card and it was expected to cost up to $150 million. People who accept the cards are not restricted from participating in class-action lawsuits against Loblaws, but any settlements they receive may be reduced by the gift card value.

Derek Nepinak was the lead plaintiff in a $1 billion class-action lawsuit on behalf of all Canadians who purchased bread from the named grocers since January 2001. As of January 2018, other lawsuits were planned by Strosberg Sasso Sutts LLP and Merchant Law Group LLP.

A senior law officer for the Competition Bureau wrote in the ITO documents that the last documented price increase occurred in December 2015, or a year and a half after the Grupo Bimbo takeover, and he believes the "conduct is ongoing."

References

Bibliography

Breads
Law enforcement in Canada
Scandals in Canada
Regulation in Canada